San Francisco psychedelic rock and grunge inspired musical collective The Love Dimension was founded in 2008 by Stoughton, Massachusetts born and Oakland, California transplant Jimmy Dias.

History
Though The Love Dimension's core & current lineup is Jimmy L. Dias (vocals/guitar), Celeste Obomsawin (vocals/percussion/flute), Devin Farney (keyboards/vocals), Robinson Kuntz (drummer) and Michael Summers (bass) the band is known for its San Francisco Bay Area collective as it has featured in its different formations   as many as over 80 different players including Andy Duncan (OK Go's original guitar player), drummer Ryan Scott Long, LoveLikeFire's Eric Amerman, The Union Trade's drummer Eitan Anzenberg, Greg Ashley (Engineer, Composer  The International Swingers that features Glen Matlock of the Sex Pistols and Clem Burke of Blondie). Dietrick also produced The Love Dimension's up coming TBA 2017 'Acceptance' album.

Discography

Albums
In Between Lives (2011 Warrior Monk Records)
Forget the Remember (2012 Warrior Monk Records)
Create and Consume (2014 Warrior Monk Records)

EPs
The Love Dimension (2010)
Not Until All Beings Are One (2012 Smoky Carrot Records)
Freakquency Space Mind Continuum (2016 A Diamond Heart Production)
Acceptance (TBA 2017)

Singles
Got Gratitude (2014 Warrior Monk Records)
Messenger of Love (2014 Warrior Monk Records)

7 Inches
The Dark Night of Your Soul/Butterflies of Bliss (2010)

Live Recordings
Live & Unplugged on Pirate Cat Radio 87.9 (2009)

References

External links
Official The Love Dimension website
Official The Love Dimension Facebook

Musical groups from San Francisco
Musical groups established in 2008
2008 establishments in California
Psychedelic rock music groups from California